Islas Chimanas is a Caribbean archipelago of 7 islands belonging to Venezuela, located off northeastern Anzoategui state, east of the Borrachas Islands and north of the Bay of Guanta, just a few kilometers from the nearby city of Puerto La Cruz, whose special attraction based primarily on beautiful beaches and bays, from the 19 December 1973 under Decree No. 1534 belong to the Mochima National Park.

Gallery

See also
Geography of Venezuela

References

External links
Location map

Caribbean islands of Venezuela
Geography of Anzoátegui
Mochima National Park
Archipelagoes of Venezuela